Hsu Ju-ya is a Taiwanese taekwondo practitioner. She won a bronze medal in middleweight at the 1989 World Taekwondo Championships, and a bronze medal at the 1993 World Taekwondo Championships. She won a silver medal at the 1994 Asian Taekwondo Championships.

References

External links

Year of birth missing (living people) 
Living people
Taiwanese female taekwondo practitioners
World Taekwondo Championships medalists
Asian Taekwondo Championships medalists
20th-century Taiwanese women